Wilhelm Hansen may refer to:

 Wilhelm Hansen (politician), Norwegian politician
 Wilhelm Hansen (publisher), Danish printer and engraver, founder of the Edition Wilhelm Hansen music publishing house
 Wilhelm Hansen (art collector), Danish businessman and art collector, founder of the Ordrupgaard Museum in Copenhagen
 Wilhelm Hansen (rower)
 Wilhelm Hansen (footballer)